Nahum Het (born 1896, died 15 January 1990) was an Israeli politician who served as a member of the Knesset for the General Zionists between 1951 and 1955.

Biography
Nahum Het was born in Odessa in the Russian Empire (today in Ukraine). He attended heder and a gymnasium before attending Odessa University. In 1917, he joined Tzeiri Zion, and became deputy chairman of the All Russia Maccabi central committee. He was a member of the Jewish self-defense organisation in Odessa. In 1919, he made aliyah to Palestine, and settled in Haifa the following year. He later studied law at the Jerusalem Law School, and was certified as a lawyer.

Het died in 1990.

Legal and political career
In 1935 he became chairman of the Maccabi central committee, serving until 1939. Between 1944 and 1948 he was a member of the Jewish National Council. From 1947 until 1948 he was a legal advisor to the Haganah's supreme command, and following independence, worked for the Ministry of Defense. In 1949 he became chairman of the Haifa branch of the General Zionists, and was also a member of Haifa city council. In 1951 he was elected to the Knesset on the party's list, but lost his seat in the 1955 elections. Also in 1951 he became president of Israel's Olympic committee, a position he held until 1956. In 1957 he became president of the World Maccabi Federation.

References

External links

1896 births
1990 deaths
Politicians from Odesa
Odesa Jews
Odesa University alumni
Soviet emigrants to Mandatory Palestine
Jewish National Council members
Haganah members
General Zionists politicians
Members of the 2nd Knesset (1951–1955)
20th-century Israeli lawyers